The 1972 Olympic football tournament, held in Munich, Augsburg, Ingolstadt, Nürnberg, Passau, and Regensburg, was played as part of the 1972 Summer Olympics. The tournament features 16 men's national teams from five continental confederations. The 16 teams are drawn into four groups of four and each group plays a round-robin tournament. At the end of the group stage, the top two teams advanced to the second group stage, where the second-placed teams in each group advanced to the bronze medal match while the first-placed teams advanced to the gold medal match held at Olympic Stadium on 10 September 1972.

In 2017, the physician of the Soviet team revealed that the match for the bronze medal between the Soviet Union and East Germany was fixed.

Qualifications

Squads

Venues

First round

Group A

Group B

Group C

Group D

Second round

Group 1

Group 2

Knockout stage

Bronze Medal match

Bronze medals shared.

Gold Medal match

Goalscorers

With nine goals, Kazimierz Deyna of Poland is the top scorer in the tournament. In total, 135 goals were scored by 66 different players, with none of them credited as own goal.

9 goals
 Kazimierz Deyna
7 goals
 Antal Dunai
6 goals

 Joachim Streich
 Robert Gadocha
 Oleh Blokhin
 Bernd Nickel

5 goals

 Hans-Jürgen Kreische
 Jürgen Sparwasser
 Ottmar Hitzfeld

3 goals

 Allan Simonsen
 Heino Hansen
 Eberhard Vogel
 Ede Dunai
 Ahmed Faras
 Viktor Kolotov
 Vyacheslav Semyonov

2 goals

 Dirceu
 Jaime Morón
 Keld Bak
 Béla Várady
 Lajos Kű
 Leonardo Cuéllar
 Jerzy Gorgoń
 Włodzimierz Lubański
 Rudolf Seliger

1 goal

 Pedrinho
 Zé Carlos
 Aung Moe Thin
 Soe Than
 Ángel Torres
 Fabio Espinosa
 Luis Montaño
 Kristen Nygaard
 Leif Printzlau
 Per Røntved
 Frank Ganzera
 Jürgen Pommerenke
 Peter Ducke
 Reinhard Häfner
 Ibrahim Sunday
 Kálmán Tóth
 Lajos Kocsis
 Mihály Kozma
 Péter Juhász
 Majid Halvai
 Salleh Ibrahim
 Shaharuddin Abdullah
 Zawawi Yusoff
 Boujemaa Benkhrif
 Mohamed Merzaq
 Mohammed El Filali
 Mohammed Tati
 Daniel Razo
 Manuel Manzo
 Kazimierz Kmiecik
 Zygfryd Szołtysik
 Gennady Yevriuzhikin
 Murtaz Khurtsilava
 Oganes Zanazanyan
 Yozhef Sabo
 Yuriy Yeliseyev
 Jaksa
 Hermann Bitz
 Jürgen Kalb
 Ronald Worm
 Uli Hoeneß

Final ranking

Medalists

References

External links

Olympic Football Tournament Munich 1972, FIFA.com
RSSSF Summary

 
1972 Summer Olympics events
1972
1972 in association football
1972
Sports competitions in Munich
Sports competitions in Nuremberg
Sport in Augsburg
Sports competitions in Ingolstadt
Passau
Sport in Regensburg
Oly
20th century in Nuremberg
20th century in Augsburg
1970s in Munich